Nafisa Ameen is a Pakistani politician who had been a member of the Provincial Assembly of the Punjab from October 2018 till January 2023.

Political career
She was elected to the Provincial Assembly of the Punjab as a candidate of Pakistan Muslim League (N) (PML-N) on a reserved seat for women in 2018 Pakistani general election.

References

Living people
Punjabi people
Pakistan Muslim League (N) MPAs (Punjab)
Punjab MPAs 2018–2023
Year of birth missing (living people)
Women members of the Provincial Assembly of the Punjab
21st-century Pakistani women politicians